Bruce Hewett (born 4 February 1954) is a Fijian sailor. He competed in the Tornado event at the 1984 Summer Olympics.

References

External links
 

1954 births
Living people
Fijian male sailors (sport)
Olympic sailors of Fiji
Sailors at the 1984 Summer Olympics – Tornado
Place of birth missing (living people)